Morning is the period from sunrise to noon. There are no exact times for when morning begins (also true of evening and night) because it can vary according to one's lifestyle and the hours of daylight at each time of year. However, morning strictly ends at noon, which is when afternoon starts. Morning can also be defined as starting from midnight to noon.

Morning precedes afternoon, evening, and night in the sequence of a day. Originally, the term referred to sunrise.

Etymology
English, unlike some other languages, has separate terms for "morning" and "tomorrow", despite their common root. Other languages, like Dutch, Scots and German, may use a single wordto signify both "morning" and "tomorrow".

Significance
Despite the less favorable lighting conditions for optical astronomy, morning can be useful for observing objects orbiting close to the Sun. Morning (and evening) serves as the optimum time period for viewing the inferior planets Venus and Mercury. It is a popular time to hunt for comets, as their tails grow more prominent as these objects draw closer to the Sun. The morning (and evening) twilight is used to search for near-Earth asteroids that orbit inside the orbit of the Earth. In mid-latitudes, the mornings near the autumnal equinox are a favorable time period for viewing the zodiacal light.

Greeting 
Some languages that use the time of day in greeting have a special greeting for morning, such as the English good morning. The appropriate time to use such greetings, such as whether it may be used between midnight and dawn, depends on the culture's or speaker's concept of morning. The use of 'good morning''' is ambiguous, usually depending on when the person woke up. As a general rule, the greeting is normally used from 3:00 a.m. to around noon. 

Many people greet someone with the shortened 'morning' rather than 'good morning'. It is used as a greeting, never a farewell, unlike 'good night' which is used as the latter. To show respect, one can add the addressee's last name after the salutation: Good morning, Mr. Smith. Religious observances 

Morning prayer is a common practice in several religions. The morning period includes specific phases of the Liturgy of the Hours of Christianity.

 Cultural use 
For some, the word morning may refer to the period immediately following waking up, irrespective of the current time of day. This modern sense of morning'' is due largely to the worldwide spread of electricity, and the independence from natural light sources.

Genetics 
The morning period may be a period of enhanced or reduced energy and productivity. The ability of a person to wake up effectively in the morning may be influenced by a gene called "Period 3". This gene comes in two forms, a "long" and a "short" variant. It seems to affect the person's preference for mornings or evenings. People who carry the long variant were over-represented as morning people, while the ones carrying the short variant were evening preference people.

Gallery

References

External links

 
Time in astronomy
Parts of a day